Spencer Martin may refer to:
Spencer Martin (racing driver) (born 1940), Australian racing driver
Spencer Martin (ice hockey) (born 1995), Canadian ice hockey goaltender